Lagarde-Enval (Limousin: La Garda) is a former commune in the Corrèze department in central France. On 1 January 2019, it was merged into the new commune Lagarde-Marc-la-Tour.

Population

See also
Communes of the Corrèze department

References

Former communes of Corrèze
Populated places disestablished in 2019